Liisa Karikoski (born 11 August 1958) is a Finnish retired ice hockey forward.  Karikoski played internationally with the Finnish national team and represented Finland at two IIHF Women's World Championships and two IIHF European Women Championships. At the 1990 IIHF Women's World Championship, the first official women's world championship sanctioned by the International Ice Hockey Federation (IIHF), Karikoski played in five games, scoring 2 goals and adding 9 assists. Finland finished the tournament with a bronze medal. In 1992, Karikoski again helped Finland to a bronze medal with 2 assists in 5 games.

References

External links

Living people
1958 births
Finnish women's ice hockey forwards
Kiekko-Espoo Naiset players
Sportspeople from Espoo